Prince Vladimir Petrovich Dolgorukov (Russian: Князь Владимир Петрович Долгоруков; 19 April 1773 – 24 November 1817) was a Russian army officer who rose to the rank of major general. He was the eldest of the three sons born to the general Prince Peter Petrovich Dolgorukov (Vladimir's younger brothers Peter and Mikhail were also generals), whilst his own son was the historian and journalist Pyotr Vladimirovich Dolgorukov.

References

Vladimir
Imperial Russian Army generals
1773 births
1817 deaths